The 2012–13 Hampton Pirates men's basketball team represented Hampton University during the 2012–13 NCAA Division I men's basketball season. The Pirates, led by fourth year head coach Edward Joyner, played their home games at the Hampton Convocation Center and were members of the Mid-Eastern Athletic Conference. They finished the season 14–17, 11–5 in MEAC play to finish in a tie for third place. They lost in the quarterfinals of the MEAC tournament to Delaware State.

Roster

Schedule

|-
!colspan=9| Regular season

|-
!colspan=9| 2013 MEAC men's basketball tournament

References

Hampton Pirates men's basketball seasons
Hampton
Hampton Pirates men's basketball
Hampton Pirates men's basketball